Events in the year 1984 in Germany.

Incumbents
President - Karl Carstens (until 30 June), Richard von Weizsäcker (starting 1 July)
Chancellor – Helmut Kohl

Events
17–28 February - 34th Berlin International Film Festival
29 March – Germany in the Eurovision Song Contest 1984
17 June - 1984 European Parliament election in West Germany
24 August - Launch of the all-new Opel Kadett, which will be built in West Germany as well as other countries including Belgium and the United Kingdom.
7 October - East German Republic Day Parade of 1984
December - The Opel Kadett is voted European Car of the Year, the first Opel car to win the award.
Date unknown: German company Grundig is taken over by Netherlands company Philips.

Births

1 January – Christian Eigler, German footballer
9 January – Benjamin Danso, German rugby player
11 January – Mark Forster, German singer-songwriter
19 January – Aljona Savchenko, pair skater
25 January – Stefan Kießling, German football player
31 May – Daniela Samulski, German swimmer (died 2018)
13 June – Antje Möldner-Schmidt, German athlete
20 June – Dennis Malura, footballer
7 July – Stephanie Stumph, German actress
1 August – Bastian Schweinsteiger, German footballer.
5 August – Helene Fischer, German singer
29 August
Christian Lell, German footballer
Alexander Hug, rugby player
Helge Meeuw, German swimmer
29 September – Per Mertesacker, German footballer.
11 October – Sebastian Ernst, German athlete
18 October
 Robert Harting, German discus thrower
 Annekatrin Thiele, German rower
24 October – Christian Reif, German athlete
24 November – Maria Höfl-Riesch, German ski racer
28 December – Martin Kaymer, German golfer

Deaths

26 January – Leny Marenbach, German actress (born 1907)
22 February – Uwe Johnson, German writer (born 1932)
6 March – Martin Niemöller, German theologian and Lutheran pastor (born 1892)
21 March – August Frank, Nazi German official, SS leader and convict at the Nuremberg trials (born 1898)
30 March – Karl Rahner, German Jesuit priest and theologian (b. 1904)
10 April – Willy Semmelrogge, German actor (born 1923)
15 April – Grete Hermann, German mathematician and philosopher (born 1901)
17 July – Karl Wolff, German Nazi SS Officer (born 1900)
9 October – Heinz von Cleve, German stage and film actor (born 1897)
21 October – Adolf Fischer, German actor (born 1900)
23 November – Paul Dahlke, German actor (born 1904)
28 November – Hans Speidel, German general (born 1897)
11 December – Krafft Arnold Ehricke, German rocket-propulsion engineer and advocate for space colonization (born 1917)
16 December – Karl Deichgräber, German classical philologist (born 1903)

See also
1984 in German television

References

 
Years of the 20th century in Germany
1980s in Germany
Germany
Germany